Ronin Warriors, known in Japan by its original title , is a Japanese anime series created by Hajime Yatate and animated by Sunrise. The television series, co-produced by Nagoya TV, aired across Japan on the All-Nippon News Network from April 30, 1988, to March 4, 1989 for a total of 39 episodes. A manga adaptation was serialized on Kodansha’s Comic BomBom from November 17, 1988 to April 5, 1990 and the chapters collected into 2 tankōbon volumes.

Plot

Talpa, the demon lord of the Netherworld and ruler of The Dynasty, is bent on conquering the mortal world. Standing against Talpa and his four Dark Warlords are the five Ronin Warriors, each in possession of mystical armor and weapons. They are assisted by Mia Koji, a young student-teacher, and a mysterious warrior-monk known only as The Ancient.

Media

Manga

Anime

Ronin Warriors was originally licensed in the United States by Graz Entertainment and distributed by Cinar (now WildBrain), and it was recorded by the Vancouver-based Ocean Productions cast. Ronin Warriors first aired on American television during the summer of 1995 and subsequently appeared through syndication, as well as the USA Network (1995), Sci-Fi Channel (1996) and later on Cartoon Network (1999).

The series was released on DVD in 2002, including the original Japanese version with English subtitles on the reverse side of the disc. On September 4, 2014, North American anime licensor Discotek Media announced their license of the original Japanese anime (Yoroiden Samurai Troopers), and planned to release the series on DVD in 2015. Discotek has said that on their Facebook page that they have no plans to release Ronin Warriors until they clear issues with the dub. Discotek has also licensed the OVAs and includes both Japanese and English audio as well as English subtitles. However, by 2021 the issues had been resolved and the series' English dub had a Blu-ray release on December 28, 2021.

Crunchyroll later added the anime series for its streaming. The English dub is legally available on streaming services such as Amazon Prime Video, RetroCrush, and Tubi.

The opening and ending sequences and the eyecatches were replaced with new ones, and the Japanese title cards were removed; there were no substantial cuts to the bodies of the episodes and the episodes retained most of the original music.

Three OVA sequels were produced: Gaiden (Side Story), The Legend of the Inferno Armor, and Message. There are numerous novels and audio dramas based on the anime. While all the sequels have been released on DVD, the manga and audio dramas have not been made available in English.

Music
Yoroiden Samurai Troopers Debut Album: Kimi o Nemurasenai (King Records, December 21, 1988, 4 weeks on Oricon chart). (4 weeks on Oricon chart, ranked as high as 44).
Yoroiden Samurai Troopers: Best Friends (King Records, June 5, 1989). (4 weeks on Oricon chart, ranked as high as 12).
"Stardust Eyes" is the opening theme for episodes 1-20 is while the ending theme is "Faraway". Both were composed by Mariko Uranishi. "Stardust Eyes" is highly influenced by the UK number 1 single It's A Sin by Pet Shop Boys
"Samurai Heart" is the opening theme from episodes 21-39,  while the ending is "Be Free" both were composed by Hiroko Moriguchi.
Gaiden would have "Stardust Eyes" and "Faraway" for its opening and closing theme for its first episode, and have "Samurai Heart" and "Be Free" for its second.
Legend of the Inferno Armor would have "Stardust Eyes" for its opening theme and "Samurai Heart" as its closing theme for every episode.
For Message, the opening theme is "Tsukamae Teite" and its solo on episode 5 is "Hoshi no Lullaby", both by Kaori Futenma.

Video Game
In July 2020, a crossover with Ragnarok Mobile was launched.

See also
Samurai Troopers (Ronin Warriors) CD Dramas

References

External links

 
 

1988 anime television series debuts
1988 manga
1989 anime OVAs
1991 anime OVAs
Anime with original screenplays
Bandai Entertainment anime titles
Bandai Namco franchises
Discotek Media
First-run syndicated television programs in the United States
Mass media franchises
Samurai in anime and manga
Shōnen manga
Sunrise (company)
Television series by Cookie Jar Entertainment
Television series by DHX Media
Television superheroes
Tokyo in fiction
Toonami